The Barranquilla Colombia Temple is a temple of the Church of Jesus Christ of Latter-day Saints (LDS Church) in Puerto Colombia, Colombia.

History
The intent to construct the temple was announced by church president Thomas S. Monson on October 1, 2011. The temple was announced concurrently with the Durban South Africa, Kinshasa Democratic Republic of the Congo, Star Valley Wyoming, and Provo City Center temples.  When announced, this increased the total number of temples worldwide to 166 and, along with the temple in Bogotá, is the second in Colombia.

The temple is in the metropolitan area of Barranquilla, in the oceanside community of Puerto Colombia across from Colegio Alemán, approximately two kilometers west of Barranquilla.  A groundbreaking ceremony, to signify the beginning of construction, took place on 20 February 2016, with Juan A. Uceda presiding. A public open house was held from November 3 through November 24, 2018, excluding Sundays. The temple was dedicated by Dallin H. Oaks on December 9, 2018.

In 2020, along with all the church's other temples, the Barranquilla Colombia Temple was closed temporarily during the year in response to the coronavirus pandemic.

See also

 List of temples of The Church of Jesus Christ of Latter-day Saints
 List of temples of The Church of Jesus Christ of Latter-day Saints by geographic region
 Comparison of temples of The Church of Jesus Christ of Latter-day Saints
 Temple architecture (Latter-day Saints)
 The Church of Jesus Christ of Latter-day Saints in Colombia

References

External links
 Barranquilla Colombia Temple Official site
 Barranquilla Colombia Temple at ChurchofJesusChristTemples.org
 Mormons to build temple in Barranquilla, Colombia Colombia news

Religious buildings and structures in Colombia
Temples (LDS Church) in South America
Temples in Colombia
The Church of Jesus Christ of Latter-day Saints in Colombia
Buildings and structures in Barranquilla
Temples (LDS Church) completed in 2018